Gresham Park is a census-designated place (CDP) in DeKalb County, Georgia, United States. The population was 7,700 at the 2020 census.

Geography
Gresham Park is located at  (33.703357, -84.314366). It is bordered by, on the:
 North: I-20, across which is the Longdale Park area of unincorporated DeKalb County
 Northwest: by the East Atlanta neighborhood of the city of Atlanta
 West: unincorporated DeKalb County, to the west of which is southeast Atlanta
 South: Constitution Road and Clifton Church Road, across which are the Bouldercrest and Cedar Grove areas of unincorporated DeKalb County
 East: Flat Shoals Road and Clifton Church Road, across which is the Panthersville CDP
 Northeast: at Flat Shoals Blvd. and I-20, to the northeast of which is the Candler-McAfee CDP

Demographics

2020 census

As of the 2020 United States census, there were 7,700 people, 3,149 households, and 1,667 families residing in the CDP.

2010 census
As of the census of 2010, there were 7,432 people, 2,797 households, and 2,397 families residing in the CDP. The racial makeup of the CDP was 8.4% White, 89% African American, 0.1% Native American, 0.3% Asian, 0.01% Pacific Islander, 0.30% from other races, and 1.7% from two or more races. Hispanic or Latino of any race were 1.5% of the population.

There were 2,797 households, out of which 24% had children under the age of 18 living with them, 35.6% were married couples living together, 37.7% had a female householder with no husband present, and 19.8% were non-families. 16.4% of all households were made up of individuals, and 2.5% had someone living alone who was 65 years of age or older.  The average household size was 3.08 and the average family size was 3.39.

In the CDP, the population was spread out, with 31.3% under the age of 18, 10.8% from 18 to 24, 28.5% from 25 to 44, 23.6% from 45 to 64, and 5.9% who were 65 years of age or older.  The median age was 30 years. For every 100 females, there were 82.2 males.  For every 100 females age 18 and over, there were 75.5 males.

The median income for a household in the CDP was $35,502, and the median income for a family was $33,938. Males had a median income of $27,063 versus $22,365 for females. The per capita income for the CDP was $18,151.  About 16.1% of families and 18.2% of the population were below the poverty line, including 27.2% of those under age 18 and 11.5% of those age 65 or over.

Education

It is in the DeKalb County Public Schools.  Zoned schools:
 Elementary schools: Barack H. Obama EMST (most) and Ronald E. McNair DLA (some) (both outside of the CDP)
 Middle schools: Ronald E. McNair (outside of the CDP)
 High schools: Ronald E. McNair High School (in the CDP)

References

Census-designated places in DeKalb County, Georgia
Census-designated places in Georgia (U.S. state)
Census-designated places in the Atlanta metropolitan area